Changcheon-dong is a dong, neighbourhood of Seodaemun-gu in Seoul, South Korea.  The sole Mormon Temple in South Korea is located here.

The Synnara Record Shop in Changcheon was used as one of the main filming locations for Seoul Broadcasting System's 2001 drama Beautiful Days, starring Lee Byung-hun, Choi Ji-woo, Ryu Si-won, Shin Min-a, Lee Jung-hyun and Lee Yoo-jin

The area has a 66 m2 store of Korean cosmetics brand Skin Food, which has been opened since June 2004 and it also sells Traditional Korean medicine or hanbang.

See also 
 Administrative divisions of South Korea

References

External links 
 Seodaemun-gu Official site in English
 Map of Seodaemun-gu
  Seodaemun-gu Official website

Neighbourhoods of Seodaemun District